Raymond Kin Wong is an American actor and writer. He is the author of the award-winning novel, The Pacific Between. He was also named as one of Pittsburgh Magazines 25 Most Beautiful People in 2007.

Career
Raymond K. Wong began his career as an Information Technology Consultant. He later became a Screen Actors Guild actor and has worked with Peter Falk, Julianne Moore, Sarah Jessica Parker, directors Rob Marshall and Peter Yates in features and TV series such as Oscar-nominated Roommates and Emmy-winning series Sex and the City.

As a writer, he is the author of the novel, The Pacific Between, which won a 2006 IPPY Book Award (Multicultural Adult Fiction). Other publications include the Pittsburgh Post-Gazette, the Writers Post Journal, the Deepening, Stories of Strength, and his film column has appeared in Actors Ink, Talk Entertainment, Cleveland.com, Boston.com, and Cincinnati.com.

Personal life
Ray, a Chinese American, was born as Raymond Kin Wong. He grew up in Hong Kong, and graduated from the University of Pittsburgh with honor. Later, he studied Creative Writing at UCLA. He became interested in acting and writing in college.

Publications
 The Pacific Between (2006) – Novel
 Better Safe Than Sorry (2007) – Short Story
 The Watch (2004) – Essay
 The Coins (2006) – Short Story
 Stories of Strength – Essay
 Ray's Rave Reviews (2003–present) – Movie Reviews
 I, the Author – Writer's Blog

Awards
 IPPY (Independent Publisher Book Award) (Multicultural Adult Fiction) – 2006

Stage 
 South Pacific – Henry
 The Pirates of Penzance – Featured pirate
 Triumph of Love – Dimas
 The King and I – Lun Tha

Filmography 
 Roommates (1995) – Deng
 Sex and the City (2004) – Featured
 The Extra (2010) - Featured

External links
 
 
 Independent Publishers Book Award
 Website

Year of birth missing (living people)
Living people
American male film actors
American male novelists
American male television actors
American novelists of Chinese descent
Hong Kong emigrants to the United States
University of Pittsburgh alumni